Lovech Province (former name Lovech okrug) is one of the 28 provinces of Bulgaria, lying at the northern centre of the country. It is named after its main city - Lovech. As of December 2009, the population of the area is 151,153.

Municipalities
The Lovech province (област, oblast) contains eight municipalities (singular: община, obshtina - plural: общини, obshtini). The following table shows the names of each municipality in English and Cyrillic, the main town or village (in bold), and the population as of December 2009.

Demographics

The following table represents the change of the population in the province after World War II:

Ethnic groups

Total population (2011 census): 141 422
Ethnic groups (2011 census):
Identified themselves: 130 180 persons:
Bulgarians:  118 346 (90,91%)
Romani: 5 705 (4,38%)
Turks:  4 337 (3,33%)
Others and indefinable:  1 792 (1,38%)
A further 11,000 persons in the Province did not declare their ethnic group at the 2011 census

In the 2001 census, 167,877 people of the population of 169,951 of Lovech Province identified themselves as belonging to one of the following ethnic groups (with percentage of total population):

Language
In the 2001 census, 168,307 people of the population of 169,951 of Lovech Province identified one of the following as their mother tongue (with percentage of total population): 
154,157 Bulgarian, 
6,994 Turkish, 
6,033 Romani, 
and 1,123 other.

Religion

Religious adherence in the province according to 2001 census:

References

See also
Provinces of Bulgaria
Municipalities of Bulgaria
List of cities and towns in Bulgaria
List of villages in Lovech Province

 
Provinces of Bulgaria

ckb:لۆڤێچ